Abid el gassad is a 1962 film directed by Kamal Attia and starring Huda Sultan, Farid Shawqi, Mahmoud Al Meleji, Tawfik El Deken, and Shafik Nour El Din.

Plot
The film revolves around Abd al-Fattah, who steals a bag of money belonging to "Uncle Amin" while he is outside a shop where the saleswoman "Samia" works. Samia photographs the theft and decides to threaten the thief to return the bag, or else she will report him to the police. A disagreement arises between "Ali" and his fellow thieves regarding returning the bag to its owner. The film follows the development of a love story between Ali and Samia, who go out together and eventually decide to get married, under the condition that Ali leaves his life of crime behind. Samia then works as a treasury employee at a small shop.

After "Ahmed" is released from prison, he meets his old friend "Ali" and discovers that his wife is actually his ex-wife, who was previously named "Wafaa" and had run away from his home. Ahmed threatens to expose her for being married to two men at the same time. To escape this situation, Wafaa decides to kill him. However, the police manage to chase and kill Ahmed, and her husband forgives her past.

Cast
 Huda Sultan as Samia/Wafaa
 Mahmoud Al Meleji as Ahmed Hassan
 Farid Shawqi as Ali Abd al-Fattah
 Tawfik El Deken as a member of Ali Abd al-Fattah's gang
 Shafik Nour El Din as Uncle Amin
 Zahia Ayoub as young Layla Ali Abd al-Fattah
 Zeinat Olwi as a dancer
 Abdel Hamid Badawi as Uncle Refa'i Al-Farash
 Fathia Shahin as the superintendent
 Mohsen Hosny as a member of Ali Abd al-Fattah's gang
 Abdul Ghani Al-Najdi as the jeweler
 El Tawky Tawfik as a gang member

External links

 
 عبيد الجسد on ElCinema

1962 films
20th-century Egyptian films
1960s Arabic-language films